Anie Samson was a city councillor from Montreal, Quebec, Canada. She became borough mayor of Villeray–Saint-Michel–Parc-Extension on January 1, 2006. She was reelected on November 1, 2009.
She lost her election on November, 5th, 2017.

She is one of the founding members of the Vision Montreal municipal political party. She previously served as city councillor for the district of Villeray from 1994 to 2005.

Samson has a Bachelor's degree in political science specializing in international relations from Université de Montréal as well as a Master's Degree in communications.

References

External links
Anie Samson (Vision Montreal)

Montreal city councillors
Living people
Mayors of places in Quebec
Université de Montréal alumni
People from Villeray–Saint-Michel–Parc-Extension
Women mayors of places in Quebec
21st-century Canadian politicians
21st-century Canadian women politicians
Women municipal councillors in Canada
Year of birth missing (living people)